Abdusalam Al-Sherif  [عبد السلام الشريف in Arabic] (born 18 April 1989 ) is a Saudi football right-back who played in the Pro League for Al-Raed FC.

References
 

1989 births
Living people
Saudi Arabian footballers
Al-Raed FC players
Place of birth missing (living people)
Saudi Professional League players
Association football fullbacks